John Trilleck or Trillick (died 20 November 1360) was a medieval Bishop of Hereford.

Trilleck was the nephew of Adam Orleton, successively Bishop of Hereford, Worcester and Winchester and the elder brother of Thomas Trilleck, later Bishop of Rochester.

Trilleck was elected to the episcopate as Bishop of Hereford on 22 February 1344 and consecrated on 29 August 1344. He founded Trellick's Inn at Oxford as undergraduate quarters.

Trilleck died on 20 November 1360.

Citations

References

External links
 
 Bristol and Gloucestershire Archaeological Society Includes some biographical notes on Trilleck/Trillick

Bishops of Hereford
14th-century English Roman Catholic bishops
1360 deaths
Year of birth unknown